Ray Thomas (3 April 1926 – 3 October 1989) was an Australian rules footballer who played with Essendon and South Melbourne in the Victorian Football League (VFL). He also played with country side, Warrnambool, in 1946.

Notes

External links 
		

Essendon Football Club past player profile

1926 births
1989 deaths
Australian rules footballers from Victoria (Australia)
Essendon Football Club players
Sydney Swans players
Warrnambool Football Club players